Manushulatho Jagratha ( Be-careful with Humans) is a 2013 Telugu-language fantasy film, produced by B. Chiranjeevulu Naidu on Vasundhara Academy banner and directed by Govinda Varaha. Starring Rajendra Prasad, Naresh, Akshay Tej, Soniya Biriji  and music composed by Pranav.

Plot
The film begins on a youngster Ramaraju (Akshay Tej) who is fed up with immorality and lack of truth in society. Meanwhile, due to Lord Brahma's (Naresh) software error, Chitragupta (Krishna Bhagwan) kills Ramaraju without the completion of his lifespan. Ramaraju goes to hell Yamalokam and realizes the mistake of Yama Dharma Raju (Rajendra Prasad). Yama Dharma Raju offers him to return his soul when Ramaraju denies and question him for one solid reason to get back into the corrupt society. Here, Yama Dharma Raju fails to show the humanity in the world. Later, Brahma arrives and provides him with an updated version of the software that's how Ramaraju sees Neetu (Soniya Biriji) and returns to his body to start loving her. The rest of the story is how Ramaraju acquires Neetu's love and reforms the society.

Cast
Rajendra Prasad as Yama Dharma Raju
Naresh as Lord Brahma
Akshay Tej as Ramaraju
Soniya Biriji as Neetu
M. S. Narayana as Solmen Raju
A.V.S as T. V. Channel Owner
Posani Krishna Murali
Pruthvi Raj as  Inspector 
Krishna Bhagawan as Chitragupta
Poornima as Doctor 
Kadamdari Kiran as Naakudu Baba
Gundu Sudarshan
Gautham Raju as Doctor 
Ambati Srinivas as Nataraju
Suman Setty as Kamaraju
Sarika Ramachandra Rao
Junior Relangi

Soundtrack

Music composed by Pranav. Music released by ADITYA Music Company.

References

2010s Telugu-language films
2010s fantasy comedy films
Indian fantasy comedy films